Faaite Airport is an airport on Faaite in French Polynesia . It was inaugurated in 1992.

References

Airports in French Polynesia